Banī Baḥir sometimes called Banī Bakhir is a sub-district located in the Shar'ab as-Salam District, Taiz Governorate, Yemen. Banī Baḥir had a population of 1,030 according to the 2004 census.

Villages
al-Masa'ad village.
al-'Uqab village.

References

Sub-districts in Shar'ab as-Salam District